Mutisia discoidea is a species of flowering plant in the family Asteraceae. It is found only in Ecuador. Its natural habitat is subtropical or tropical dry shrubland. It is threatened by habitat loss.

References

Further reading
 Gunnar Wilhelm Harling and Bengt Lennart Andersson 1991. Flora of Ecuador, no. 42: Compositae–Mutisieae. Published by Department of Systematic Botany, University of Goteborg and the Section for Botany, Riksmuseum, Stockholm.

External links
 Entry in Tropicos

discoidea
Endemic flora of Ecuador
Vulnerable plants
Taxonomy articles created by Polbot